This is a list of radio stations that broadcast on FM frequency 101.6 MHz:

Albania 
 Plus 2 Radio, a national private radio station operating in Albania

Bangladesh 
Coloursfm 101.6

Bulgaria 
 Horizont (radio) a state-owned Bulgarian Radio Station

Cyprus 
 Logos Radio

Finland 
 Radio KLF a radio station based in Helsinki

France 
 France Bleu the regional radio network of Radio France

Greece 
 Eleftheri Radiofonas Krestena
 Tik Tower Radio 101.4 FM

Indonesia 
 ZOO FM Batam

Latvia 
 AlisePlus

Republic of Ireland 
 West Limerick 102 a community radio station broadcasting to the western parts of County Limerick in Ireland

Malaysia 
 Zayan in Kota Kinabalu, Sabah(?)

New Zealand 
 Radio New Zealand National a publicly funded non-commercial New Zealand English language radio network operated by Radio New Zealand

United Arab Emirates 
 City FM 101.6

United Kingdom 
 Asian Star
 Classic FM (UK) one of the United Kingdom's three Independent National Radio stations
 Greatest Hits Radio Berkshire & North Hampshire
 KMFM West Kent an Independent Local Radio serving the towns of Sevenoaks, Tonbridge, Royal Tunbridge Wells and the surrounding areas in Kent, South East England
 Capital Mid-Counties, launched 1200 BST on Saturday April 29, 2006

References

Lists of radio stations by frequency